Refúgio  is the fifth studio album by Brazilian rock band Apocalypse released in 2003 and the second under Rock Symphony Record Company. Musically, Refúgio features symphonic rock with complex arrangements for keyboards, including  organ, piano, digital synthesizer, analog minimoog synthesizer, drums and electric guitar. Refúgio album contains some fan favorites such as the album’s title track and the two progressive epics Cachoeira das Águas Douradas ( Waterfall of Golden Waters)  and América do Sul (South America). The band included two bonus tracks from the USA Live recordings Último Horizonte and Terra Azul. The album was to be the last recordings with the band's original lineup.

Track listing
 Refúgio
 Cachoeira das Águas Douradas 
 Viagem no Tempo  
 América do Sul
 Toccata
 Amazônia  
 ProgJazz  
 Liberdade
 Lembranças Eternas
 III Milênio
 Último Horizonte (bonus track(
 Terra Azul (bonus track)

Musicians
 Eloy Fritsch: Electronic keyboards, Organ, Minimoog, vocals
 Ruy Fritsch: Electric and acoustic guitars, vocals
 Chico Fasoli: Drums, percussion, vocals
 Chico Casara: Lead Vocal, Bass guitar

References

2003 albums
Apocalypse (band) albums